Convoy HX 47 was a North Atlantic convoy of the HX series which ran during the battle of the Atlantic in World War II. 
It was the 47th of the numbered series of merchant convoys run by the Allies from Halifax to Liverpool.
The convoy was attacked by German U-boats and lost three of its 58 ships.

Background
HX 47 was formed of two sections sailing from the Americas.
The main body, of 37 ships departed Halifax on 2 June 1940 with ships gathered from the US eastern seaboard; it was led by convoy commodore Adm. BS Thesiger RN in the steamship Pacific Pioneer. It was accompanied by its ocean escort, the armed merchant cruiser HMS Esperance Bay, and a local escort, a Royal Canadian Navy destroyer.
Two ships dropped out early in the voyage; Randsfjord was damaged in collision with a Greek steamer and returned for repairs, and another returned to port for degaussing.

On  8 June the convoy was joined by BHX 47, 21 ships from the Caribbean and South America, that had gathered at Bermuda, departing there on 31 May escorted by the armed merchant cruiser  and a local escort.

Ranged against HX 47 were U-boats of the German Navy's U-boat Arm (UBW), on patrol in Britain's sea lanes.

Action
On 14 June HX 47’s Western Approaches escort arrived.
During the crossing three ships had dropped out of convoy; of these, Balmoralwood, was sighted on 14 June by U-47 and sunk, 70 miles from Cape Clear Island.

That evening U-38 had attacked the Greek freighter Mount Myrto, on independent passage; sighting HX 47 the U-boat left the freighter in a sinking condition and stalked the convoy. Attacking after  midnight of 14/15 June U-38 sank two ships, the tanker Italia and the freighter Erik Boye. The U-boat escaped and HX 47 continued without further loss.

The main body of the convoy reached Liverpool on 17 June.

Conclusion
Of the 58 ships that set out, two turned back and three were sunk. 53 ships made a safe and timely arrival. HX 47 was one of two trans-Atlantic convoys attacked during June, the other, HX 49, also losing three ships. During the month as a whole the UBW sank 63 ships in the Atlantic; most of these were unescorted vessels sailing independently. June 1940 was the beginning of a marked increase in successes by the U-boat Arm, referred to by them as "The Happy Time".

Ships in the convoy

Merchant ships
Convoy information is from Arnold Hague's Convoyweb

Escort
Escort information is from Arnold Hague's Convoyweb

Axis forces
U-boat information is from Guðmundur Helgason's uboat.net

References

Bibliography
 Blair, Clay (1996) Hitler's U-boat War Vol I Cassell 
 
 
 
 Tarrant, VE (1989) The U-boat Offensive: 1914-1945. Arms & Armour

External links
 HX.47 at convoyweb

HX047
Conflicts in 1940
Naval battles of World War II involving the United Kingdom
Naval battles of World War II involving Germany
Naval battles of World War II involving Canada